The Men's scratch competition at the 2019 UCI Track Cycling World Championships was held on 28 February 2019.

Results
The race was started at 19:53. First rider across the line without a net lap loss won.

References

Men's scratch
2019